The 2015–16 CSA Provincial One-Day Challenge was a List A cricket competition that took place in South Africa from 11 October 2015 to 9 April 2016. The competition was played between the thirteen South African provincial teams and Namibia.

North West finished top of Pool A and Gauteng finished top of Pool B, with both teams progressing to the final of the competition. The final was played at Senwes Park, Potchefstroom. Gauteng won the match, beating North West by 7 wickets.

Points table

Pool A

 Team qualified for the final

Pool B

 Team qualified for the final

Final

References

External links
 Series home at ESPN Cricinfo

South African domestic cricket competitions
CSA Provincial One-Day Challenge
2015–16 South African cricket season